Big Pine (formerly, Bigpine) is a census-designated place (CDP) in Inyo County, California, United States. The population was 1,756 at the 2010 census, up from 1,350 at the 2000 census. The Big Pine Band of Owens Valley Paiute Shoshone Indians of the Big Pine Reservation operates their tribal headquarters from here.

Geography
Big Pine is located in the Owens Valley of California between the Sierra Nevada and the White Mountains, just west of the Owens River upstream of its diversion into the Los Angeles Aqueduct.  It lies on U.S. Route 395, the main north–south artery through the Owens Valley, connecting the Inland Empire to Reno, Nevada. US 395 also connects Big Pine to Los Angeles via State Route 14 through Palmdale.

To the East, CA route 168 crosses the White Mountains over Westgard Pass to the basin and range province of Nevada, while Death Valley Road leads to Death Valley. The plaque beneath the young giant sequoia (pictured), referred to as the Roosevelt Pine,   at the road junction says it was planted in 1913 to commemorate the opening of Westgaard Pass to auto traffic. The landmark giant sequoia was felled on September 28, 2020, after most of its foliage had died following its sole water source drying up in the 2017-18 drought. North from Westgaard Pass lies the Ancient Bristlecone Pine Forest, home to the oldest trees in the world.

To the West, Glacier Lodge Road leads high up Big Pine Creek into the Sierra, to lakes, hiking trails, fishing, and rock climbing underneath the Palisades Range and the Palisade Glacier.

History

The Big Pine post office first opened in 1870, closed for a time during 1877, changed its name to Bigpine in 1895, and reverted to Big Pine in 1962.

Big Pine has a significant geologic feature (an earthquake scarp) related to the 1872 Lone Pine earthquake.

In 1958, the Owens Valley Radio Observatory was established just north of Big Pine.

Matt Williams, a professional baseball player and manager, lived there for part of his life. Hollywood character actor Elisha Cook, Jr., known for such classic films as The Maltese Falcon and Shane, had a home in Big Pine and died here in 1995.

Demographics

2010
The 2010 United States Census reported that Big Pine had a population of 1,756. The racial makeup of Big Pine was 1,192 (67.9%) White, 3 (0.2%) African American, 438 (24.9%) Native American, 13 (0.7%) Asian, 1 (0.1%) Pacific Islander, 52 (3.0%) from other races, and 57 (3.2%) from two or more races. Hispanic or Latino of any race were 182 persons (10.4%).

The Census reported that 1,756 people (100% of the population) lived in households, 0 (0%) lived in non-institutionalized group quarters, and 0 (0%) were institutionalized.

There were 764 households, out of which 184 (24.1%) had children under the age of 18 living in them, 360 (47.1%) were opposite-sex married couples living together, 100 (13.1%) had a female householder with no husband present, 37 (4.8%) had a male householder with no wife present.  There were 49 (6.4%) unmarried opposite-sex partnerships, and 7 (0.9%) same-sex married couples or partnerships. 219 households (28.7%) were made up of individuals, and 100 (13.1%) had someone living alone who was 65 years of age or older. The average household size was 2.30.  There were 497 families (65.1% of all households); the average family size was 2.78.

The population was spread out, with 341 people (19.4%) under the age of 18, 118 people (6.7%) aged 18 to 24, 381 people (21.7%) aged 25 to 44, 571 people (32.5%) aged 45 to 64, and 345 people (19.6%) who were 65 years of age or older.  The median age was 46.6 years. For every 100 females, there were 97.1 males.  For every 100 females age 18 and over, there were 92.3 males.

The homeowner vacancy rate was 1.5%; the rental vacancy rate was 6.3%.  1,357 people (77.3% of the population) lived in owner-occupied housing units and 399 people (22.7%) lived in rental housing units.

2000
As of the census of 2000, there were 1,350 people, 571 households, and 403 families residing in the CDP. The racial makeup of the CDP was 86.07% White, 0.15% Black or African American, 4.30% Native American, 0.59% Asian, 3.19% from other races, and 5.70% from two or more races.  8.00% of the population were Hispanic or Latino of any race.

There were 571 households, out of which 24.2% had children under the age of 18 living with them, 59.5% were married couples living together, 5.6% had a female householder with no husband present, and 29.4% were non-families. 24.7% of all households were made up of individuals, and 11.9% had someone living alone who was 65 years of age or older.  The average household size was 2.29 and the average family size was 2.70.

In the CDP, the population was spread out, with 20.4% under the age of 18, 3.9% from 18 to 24, 23.0% from 25 to 44, 26.3% from 45 to 64, and 26.4% who were 65 years of age or older.  The median age was 47 years. For every 100 females, there were 98.8 males.  For every 100 females age 18 and over, there were 93.3 males.

The median income for a household in the CDP was $37,115, and the median income for a family was $46,094. Males had a median income of $41,827 versus $26,500 for females. The per capita income for the CDP was $20,109.  About 7.1% of families and 10.1% of the population were below the poverty line, including 7.5% of those under age 18 and 9.0% of those age 65 or over.

Big Pine students are served by Big Pine Unified School District which features an elementary school, middle school, high school and a continuation high school. The Big Pine high school mascot is the Warrior.

Politics

Piper v. Big Pine (1924) 193 Cal. 664 
In 1923, Alice Piper, a 15-year-old Native American living in Big Pine, wanted to attend Big Pine school, but was denied on grounds of her ethnicity. Piper, the daughter of Pike and Annie Piper, sued the school district, claiming the state law establishing separate schools for “Indian children” and other children of Asian parentage was unconstitutional.

The State Supreme Court ruled unanimously that because Alice Piper's father was a tax-paying citizen, that Alice Piper therefore qualified as a citizen under the Dawes Act.  The court did not, in fact, find that her 14th Amendment rights had been violated.  Nonetheless, Alice Piper was invited as a pupil and her victory along with the passage the Indian Citizenship Act, on the same day opened the door for her and other Native American children to attend public schools in the state of California.  Because of this, the Big Pine School District is memorialized as a major player in the constitutional battle over the rights of Native Americans to attend public schools segregated for “whites only.”

The Piper case has become a landmark case and is viewed as the legal authority guaranteeing Native American children the right to attend public schools. It has been used as precedence in other cases such as Brown v. Board of Education.

See also 

 Big Pine volcanic field

References

External links

Census-designated places in Inyo County, California
Owens Valley
Populated places in the Mojave Desert
Census-designated places in California